is a town located in Itano District, in northeastern Tokushima Prefecture, Japan.

Geography 
Aizumi is located in northern part of Tokushima Prefecture on the island of Shikoku. It is situated on the north side of the downstream area of the Yoshino River. The area is an alluvial fan which was once subject to frequent flooding before Edo period flood control projects shifted the course of the Yoshino River from its original stream to its current stream some three kilometers south. At 5.17 meters average elevation above sea level the area is a very flat area with no hilly or mountainous areas found within the confines of the town district.

Neighbouring municipalities 
Tokushima Prefecture
 Tokushima
 Naruto
 Itano
 Kitajima
 Kamiita
 Ishii

Climate
Aizumi has a Humid subtropical climate (Köppen Cfa) characterized by warm summers and cool winters with light snowfall.  The average annual temperature in Aizumi is 15.9 °C. The average annual rainfall is 1637 mm with September as the wettest month. The temperatures are highest on average in August, at around 26.6 °C, and lowest in January, at around 4.6 °C. The annual mean rainfall is 1,586.6 mm, and the average monthly discharge is 132.2 mm. During winter, the average monthly discharge is 50 mm throughout the season, with a touch of Seto Inland Sea-style climate being present.

Demographics
Per Japanese census data, the population of Aizumi has been growing rapidly since the 1960s. With a population growth rate of 10% over the past 10 years, it is one of the most developed towns in Tokushima Prefecture.

History 
As with all of Tokushima Prefecture, the area of Aizumi was part of ancient Awa Province. From the Muromachi period,  Shōzui Castle was the seat of the Hosokawa clan and later the Miyoshi clan who ruled as shugo of the province. Chōsokabe Motochika seized control of the province in the Sengoku period and Shōzui Castle fell into ruins. He was subsequently defected by the forces of Toyotomi Hideyoshi. During the Edo period, the area was part of the holdings of Tokushima Domain ruled by the Hachisuka clan from their seat at Tokushima Castle, and Aizumi became an agricultural area noted for its production of indigo. The villages of Aizono (藍園村) and Sumiyoshi (住吉村) were established within Itano District, Tokushima with the creation of the modern municipalities system on October 1, 1889. The two village merged on April 29, 1955 to form the town of Aizumi.

Government
Aizumi has a mayor-council form of government with a directly elected mayor and a unicameral town council of 16 members. Aizumi, together with the other municipalities of Itano District, contributes four members to the Tokushima Prefectural Assembly. In terms of national politics, the town is part of Tokushima 2nd district of the lower house of the Diet of Japan.

Economy
Aizumi has a mixed economy of agriculture and light manufacturing. The production of indigo dye and miso fermented bean paste are traditional local industries. Due to its geographical location and abundance of flat land for housing development, Aizumi is also developing into a commuter town for neighboring Tokushima.

Education
Aizumi has four public elementary schools and two public middle schools operated by the town government and one public high school operated by the Tokushima Prefectural Department of Education.

Transportation

Railway
 Shikoku Railway Company – Kōtoku Line

Highways 
  Tokushima Expressway

Local attractions
Shōzui Castle ruins, National Historic Site

References

External links

Aizumi official website  

Towns in Tokushima Prefecture
Aizumi, Tokushima